Aarón M. Ortíz is a Democratic member of the Illinois House of Representatives for the 1st district.

Early life
Prior to his election to the Illinois House of Representatives, Ortíz was a teacher and college counselor at Back of the Yards High School. He is a graduate of the University of Illinois at Urbana-Champaign.

Illinois House of Representatives
Ortíz defeated Daniel J. Burke in the 2018 Democratic primary as part of a slate of Latino candidates backed by now Congressman Chuy García, and Senator Bernie Sanders. He was sworn into office January 9, 2019.

On March 17, 2020, Ortiz handily defeated his primary challenger Alicia Martinez, a worker with Brackenbox, Inc., and a former staffer and member of Alderman Edward M. Burke's political organization.

On January 21, 2021, Ortiz was added to House Leadership and was named as a new House Majority Caucus Whip. On February 5, 2021, Ortiz was elected as the House Chair for the Illinois Legislative Latino Caucus.

As of July 2, 2022, Representative Ortíz is a member of the following Illinois House Committees:

 Appropriations - Elementary & Secondary Education (HAPE)
 Appropriations - General Service (HAPG)
 Appropriations - Human Services (HAPH)
 Labor & Commerce (HLBR)
 Medicaid & Managed Care Subcommittee (HAPH-MEDI)
 Mental Health & Addiction (HMEH)
 Transportation Issues Subcommittee (HVES-TVSI)
 Transportation: Vehicles & Safety (HVES)

Ward Committeeperson
On March 18, 2020, the same night of his first re-election, Ortiz defeated 52-year incumbent Edward M. Burke to become the first Latino Ward Committeeperson in Chicago's 14th Ward.

Electoral history

References

External links
Representative Aaron M. Ortiz (D) at the Illinois General Assembly
Illinois House Democratic Caucus
Campaign website

21st-century American politicians
1991 births
Living people
Democratic Party members of the Illinois House of Representatives
Hispanic and Latino American state legislators in Illinois
Politicians from Chicago
Schoolteachers from Illinois
University of Chicago alumni